The 2002–03 NBA season was the Grizzlies' 8th season in the National Basketball Association, and their second season in Memphis. In the 2002 NBA draft, the Grizzlies selected Drew Gooden from the University of Kansas with the fourth overall pick, and acquired Wesley Person from the Cleveland Cavaliers. In their second season in Memphis, the Grizzlies got off to a rocky start losing their first eight games, as head coach Sidney Lowe resigned and replaced with 69-year old Hubie Brown, who last coached the New York Knicks midway through the  1986–87 season. The Grizzlies continued to struggle under Brown losing their next five games. This would lead to a 13-game losing streak before defeating the Washington Wizards 85–74 on November 23. At midseason, the team traded rookies Gooden and Gordan Giriček to the Orlando Magic in exchange for Mike Miller. The Grizzlies finished sixth in the Midwest Division with a 28–54 record. Second-year star Pau Gasol led the team with 19.0 points, 8.8 rebounds and 1.8 blocks per game.

Despite their awful season, the Grizzlies would lose their chance to pick second in the 2003 NBA draft to the Detroit Pistons, who had lost in the Eastern Conference Finals to the New Jersey Nets in the playoffs. Following the season, Brevin Knight was traded to the Phoenix Suns, and Michael Dickerson retired after just five seasons in the NBA due to continuing injuries.

Draft picks

Roster

Regular season

Season standings

z - clinched division title
y - clinched division title
x - clinched playoff spot

Record vs. opponents

Game log

Player statistics

Awards and records
Gordon Giricek, NBA All-Rookie Team 2nd Team

Transactions

References

See also
2002-03 NBA season

Memphis Grizzlies seasons
Memphis
Memphis Grizzlies
Memphis Grizzlies
Events in Memphis, Tennessee